The 2015–16 NC State Wolfpack men's basketball team represented North Carolina State University during the 2015–16 NCAA Division I men's basketball season. The Wolfpack were led by fifth year head coach Mark Gottfried. The team played its home games at PNC Arena and were members of the Atlantic Coast Conference (ACC). They finished the season 16–17, 5–13 in ACC play to finish in 13th place. They defeated Wake Forest in the first round of the ACC tournament to advance to the second round where they lost to Duke.

Previous season
The Wolfpack finished the season 22–14, 10–8 in ACC play to finish in a tie for sixth place. They advanced to the quarterfinals of the ACC tournament where they lost to Duke. They received an at-large bid to the NCAA tournament, where they defeated LSU in the second round and Villanova in the third round to advance to the Sweet Sixteen, where they lost to fellow ACC member Louisville.

Pre-season

Departures

Class of 2015 signees
In addition to freshman signees Shaun Kirk and Maverick Rowan, NC State also added University of Charlotte transfer Torin Dorn.  Dorn, a sophomore guard who will redshirt the 2015–2016 season due to NCAA transfer rules, was the 2015 Conference USA Freshman of the Year.

Roster

}
}

Season

Non-conference Play
NC State opened the season with an 85–68 win at home to William & Mary.  During the loss, guard Terry Henderson suffered torn ligaments in his right ankle and missed the entire season.

Conference Play

Schedule and results

|-
!colspan=12 style="background:#E00000; color:white;"| Exhibition

|-
!colspan=12 style="background:#E00000; color:white;"| Non-Conference Regular season

|-
!colspan=12 style="background:#E00000; color:white;"| ACC Regular season

|-
!colspan=12 style="background:#E00000; color:white;"| ACC Tournament

References

NC State Wolfpack men's basketball seasons
NC State
2015 in sports in North Carolina
2016 in sports in North Carolina